Stephen Herdoiza (born July 21, 1969) is an American former professional tennis player.

A native of Bloomfield Hills, Michigan, Herdoiza played collegiate tennis for Northwestern University from 1988 to 1991, earning All-Big 10 selection all four years. He won the Big 10 singles title in 1989, then in 1990 reached the quarter-finals of the NCAA championships and was named an All-American. In 1990 he was also a member of Northwestern's Big Ten championship winning team, playing beside future world number four Todd Martin.

Herdoiza, who reached a best singles world ranking of 281, made his only ATP Tour main draw appearance as a qualifier at the 1995 Canadian Open, where he was beaten in the first round by Mark Philippoussis.

References

External links
 
 

1969 births
Living people
American male tennis players
Northwestern Wildcats men's tennis players
Tennis people from Michigan
People from Bloomfield Hills, Michigan
Sportspeople from Detroit